Cave de Sueth (medieval French name; in modern French: Cave de Suète), known from medieval Latin sources as Cava de Suet, as Habis Jaldak in medieval Arabic and as 'Ain al-Habis in modern Arabic, was a 12th-century cave castle built into the southern cliffs of the Yarmouk River gorge in modern-day Jordan, across from the southern foothills of the Golan Heights. It was located at the edge of the Terre de Suète region (al-Sawad, "the black" in Arabic).

History
The fortress was established by 1109 among the ruins of a Byzantine monastic laura. Hugh Kennedy accepts Ibn al-Qalanisi's description of the destruction by Toghtekin, atabeg of Damascus, of the Castle of al-Al in the western Golan Heights in 1105, whose remains are yet to be identified, and presents the Crusader presence at the Cave de Sueth as the "more circumspect" position adopted after the loss of that advanced outpost. In 1109, a truce was declared between Baldwin I and Toghtekin, and the surrounding area, Terre de Suète, was supposed to be ruled as a condominium by Jerusalem and Damascus. Nevertheless, the castle was attacked by Toghtekin in 1111, killing its Frankish garrison, but was retaken by the Franks two years later. The Muslims captured the castle in 1118 only to lose it in the campaign of Baldwin II that resulted in capture of the entire Yarmouk valley. Nur ad-Din besieged Cave de Sueth in 1158, but retreated with the approach of Baldwin III. In 1182 the castle was captured by Farrukh Shah, the nephew of Saladin, only to return to Frankish control later that year, where it remained until shortly before the conquests of Saladin in 1187.

References

Bibliography

  Also at Wisconsin U. Library.
 

 Kennedy, Hugh (2001). Crusader Castles. Cambridge University Press, pp. 40, 52-53.

 Nicolle, David (1988). "Ain al-Habis: The Cave de Sueth". Archéologie médiévale 18, pp. 113-140. Full article online at persee.fr, with plans, photos, and William of Tyre's description of the second siege of 1182.
  Oct 2021: page not accessible on Google Books.
 Runciman, Steven (1952). A History of the Crusades, Volume Two: The Kingdom of Jerusalem and the Frankish East, 1100-1187. Cambridge University Press, London, pp. 95-96. Oct 2021: no access via Google Books.
 

Castles and fortifications of the Kingdom of Jerusalem
Archaeological sites in Jordan
Principality of Galilee